Red Mountain, formerly known as Osdick, is an unincorporated community in San Bernardino County, California, United States.

Red Mountain has a post office with ZIP code 93558. The post office opened under the name Osdick in 1922 and changed its name to Red Mountain in 1929.

In 2022, the community received a $1.5 million grant to clean sediment of arsenic from historic gold and silver mining from the kelly mine complex

References

Populated places in the Mojave Desert
Mining communities in California
Unincorporated communities in San Bernardino County, California
Unincorporated communities in California